Schleswig-Holstein (D182) was the second ship of the Hamburg-class destroyer of the German Navy.

Background 
The Type 101 Hamburg class was the only class of destroyers built during post-war Germany. They were specifically designed to operate in the Baltic Sea, where armament and speed is more important than seaworthiness. They were named after Bundesländer (states of Germany) of West Germany.

The German shipyard Stülcken was contracted to design and build the ships. Stülcken was rather inexperienced with naval shipbuilding, but got the order, since the shipyards traditionally building warships for the German navies like Blohm + Voss, Howaldtswerke or Lürssen were all occupied constructing commercial vessels.

Construction and career
Schleswig-Holstein was laid down on 20 August 1959 and launched on 20 August 1960 in Hamburg. She was commissioned on 12 October 1964 and decommissioned on 15 December 1994. Finally towed to Belgium and scrapped in 1998.

Gallery

References

Hamburg-class destroyers
1960 ships
Ships built in Hamburg